The 1976 Missouri Tigers football team was an American football team that represented the University of Missouri in the Big Eight Conference (Big 8) during the 1976 NCAA Division I football season. The team compiled a 6–5 record (3–4 against Big 8 opponents), finished in sixth place in the Big 8, and was outscored by opponents by a combined total of 246 to 241. Al Onofrio was the head coach for the sixth of seven seasons. The team played its home games at Faurot Field in Columbia, Missouri.

The team's statistical leaders included Curtis Brown with 844 rushing yards, Pete Woods with 996 passing yards and 1,189 yards of total offense, Joe Stewart with 834 receiving yards, and placekicker Tim Gibbons with 62 points scored.

Schedule

Personnel

Season summary

at USC

Illinois

at Ohio State

North Carolina

at Kansas State

Iowa State

at Nebraska

at Oklahoma State

Colorado

at Oklahoma

Kansas

References

Missouri
Missouri Tigers football seasons
Missouri Tigers football